The Roman Catholic Diocese of Popokabaka is a diocese located in the city of Popokabaka  in the Ecclesiastical province of Kinshasa in the Democratic Republic of the Congo.

History
 June 24, 1961: Established as Diocese of Popokabaka from the Diocese of Kisantu

Bishops

Bishops of Popokabaka
Pierre Bouckaert, S.J. (24 June 1961 – 1 December 1979)
André Mayamba Mabuti Kathongo (1 December 1979 – 24 September 1993)
Louis Nzala Kianza (22 April 1996 – 29 June 2020)
Bernard Marie Fansaka Biniama (installed 23 August 2020 -)

Coadjutor bishop
André Mayamba Mabuti Kathongo (1978-1979)

Other priest of this diocese who became bishop
Charles Ndaka Salabisala, appointed auxiliary bishop of Kinshasa in 2020

See also
Roman Catholicism in the Democratic Republic of the Congo

References

Sources
 GCatholic.org
 Catholic Hierarchy

Roman Catholic dioceses in the Democratic Republic of the Congo
Christian organizations established in 1961
Roman Catholic dioceses and prelatures established in the 20th century
1961 establishments in the Republic of the Congo (Léopoldville)
Roman Catholic Ecclesiastical Province of Kinshasa